Farnham Maltings is a creative arts centre in the heart of the market town of Farnham in Surrey, England

History
Farnham Maltings was bought by the community, currently led by its town council in 1969.

Facilities
Its buildings comprise a range of large rehearsal spaces, Great Hall, 15 artists studios, pottery, café and cellar bar.

Uses
The Maltings' stated ambition is to encourage the most people to make the best art that they can.

The Maltings hosts a regular programme of performance that includes folk, roots and acoustic music, blues and jazz music, cinema, stand up comedy, musical theatre and children's theatre. In addition it hosts a number of festivals, including festival of crafts, unravel, sugarcraft, quilting and gardening and an annual Christmas Fair. The Maltings also works with a number of regional theatre companies managing it as an international showcase and producing new work for new audiences.

See also

References

External links
Farnham Maltings homepage

Theatres in Surrey
Buildings and structures in Surrey
Buildings and structures in Farnham
Arts centres in England
Farnham